The New Zealand women's national cricket team toured Australia in February 2009. They played against Australia in one Twenty20 International, which was a double-header with a men's T20I, also between Australia and New Zealand, at the Sydney Cricket Ground. Australia won the match, which was reduced by rain, by 9 wickets. The tour preceded both sides' participation in the 2009 World Cup, which was also held in Australia.

Squads

Only WT20I

References

External links
New Zealand Women tour of Australia 2008/09 from Cricinfo

Women's international cricket tours of Australia
2009 in Australian cricket
New Zealand women's national cricket team tours